MS Pride of Burgundy is a cross-channel ferry owned by P&O Ferries. She has operated on the Dover to Calais route since 1993.

History
MS Pride of Burgundy was planned as the fourth 'European Class' freight-only vessel, to be named European Causeway for P&O European Ferries' Dover to Zeebrugge route. Due to demand on the Dover - Calais route, the ship was converted to a multi-purpose ferry (passengers and freight) prior to completion with the addition of extra superstructure. It is a commonly stated in ferry publications and website that the original choice of name for the ship was Pride of Lille. By capacity, she is one of the smallest Dover – Calais ferries, only taking 1,200 passengers and 600 cars.

In 2010 she was chartered to Ramsgate in east Kent to host the opening of the Thanet Wind farm. The Pride of Burgundy took new crew, wind farm employees, their families and VIPs right out to sea to see the wind turbines up close. She was back in service the next day

On 27 October 2012 the Pride of Burgundy collided with the MyFerryLink ship MS Berlioz due to high winds. The Pride of Burgundy sustained damage to its right bridge wing, but was fixed in a couple of hours. The MS Berlioz received damage to her lifeboats putting her out of service.

The Pride of Burgundy departed Dover on 3 March 2017 for Gdansk (Poland) where she underwent a major refit. She arrived at the Remontowa shipyard on 5 March and returned to Dover on 25 March, resuming her usual Dover to Calais schedule the following day.

In early 2019, the Pride of Burgundy, like all P&O vessels on the Dover-to-Calais route, has been flagged out to Cyprus, a measure explained by the company as motivated by tax advantages in view of Brexit. She is now registered in Limassol.

From 3 May 2020 the Pride of Burgundy was docked at the Port of Leith, Scotland, as a result of the reduction in traffic across the straights of Dover due to the Covid-19 pandemic. She returned to Dover in late October that year and sailed to Calais on Friday 30th, re-entering service on 3 November in a freight-only mode.

On 7 December the ship was moved to the River Fal lay up berths. These are deep water berths near Falmouth in Cornwall.

Layout
Pride of Burgundy is the second smallest vessel (after the freight only "European Seaway") to operate a frequent service on the P&O Ferries Dover to Calais Route. She has 11 decks.

Sister ships
Pride of Burgundy has no identical sisters because of her conversion to multi-purpose passenger vessel during construction. She shares mechanical, layout and visual features with the other 'European Class' ships in the P&O fleet:-

 (ex-European Pathway)
 (ex-European Highway)

References

External links

 mv Pride of Burgundy @ The Online Guide to P&O Ferries

Ferries of the United Kingdom
Ferries of France
Connections across the English Channel
1992 ships
Ships of P&O Ferries